Xiji Town is a town located in eastern part of Tongzhou District, Beijing, China. It borders Lucheng and Qigezhuang Towns to the north, Jiangxintun Town to the east, Huoxian Town to the south, and Zhangjiawan Town to the west. Its population was 46,678 as of 2020.

The name Xiji refers to the local market during the Qing dynasty.

History

Administration divisions 
At the end of 2021, Xiji Town consisted of 57 villages:

See also 

 List of township-level divisions of Beijing

References 

Towns in Beijing
Tongzhou District, Beijing